Jaelyn Duncan (born July 8, 2000) is an American football offensive tackle for the Maryland Terrapins.

High school career
Duncan attended Northern High School in Owings, Maryland for three years, before transferring to Saint Frances Academy in Baltimore, Maryland for his senior year. He was selected to play in the Under Armour All-American Game in 2018. He committed to the University of Maryland, College Park to play college football.

College career
After not playing his first year at Maryland in 2018, Duncan took over as the starting left tackle his redshirt freshman year in 2019. As a sophomore in 2020, he started all five of Maryland's games. As a junior in 2021, he played in all 13 games with 13 starts including Maryland's bowl victory over Virginia Tech in the Pinstripe Bowl. Duncan returned to Maryland for his senior season in 2022.

In January 2023, Duncan was invited to participate in both the 2023 Senior Bowl and the 2023 NFL Combine.

References

External links

Maryland Terrapins bio

Living people
Players of American football from Maryland
American football offensive tackles
Maryland Terrapins football players
2000 births